John Kenneth Wilson,  (15 October 1890 – 17 August 1949) was a Church of England priest and former Royal Navy chaplain. He was Chaplain of the Fleet, Director General of the Naval Chaplaincy Service and Archdeacon for the Royal Navy from 1943 to 1947.

He was educated at St Paul's School, London and Corpus Christi College, Cambridge. After a curacy at St Michael at Bowes, London he was a Chaplain to the Forces from  1917 to 1920. He was then at Newton Nottage from  1920 to 1926; then St James, Portsmouth until 1928. He then served as a Naval Chaplain until 1947.

Footnotes

1890 births
1949 deaths
20th-century English Anglican priests
Chaplains of the Fleet
People educated at St Paul's School, London
Companions of the Order of the Bath
Alumni of Corpus Christi College, Cambridge
Commanders of the Order of the British Empire